α-Hexachlorocyclohexane (α-HCH) is an organochloride which is one of the isomers of hexachlorocyclohexane (HCH).  It is a byproduct of the production of the insecticide lindane (γ-HCH) and it is typically still contained in commercial grade lindane used as insecticide. Lindane, however, has not been produced or used in the United States for more than 20 years. At ambient temperatures it is a stable, white, powdery solid substance.  As of 2009, the Stockholm Convention on Persistent Organic Pollutants classified (α-HCH) and (β-HCH) as persistent organic pollutants (POPs), due to the chemical's ability to persistence in the environment, bioaccumulative, biomagnifying, and long-range transport capacity.

See also
β-Hexachlorocyclohexane

References

External links
α-hexachlorocyclohexane United States Environmental Protection Agency IRIS fact sheet
Cyclohexane, 1,2,3,4,5,6-hexachloro-, (1α,2β,3α,4β,5α,6β)- – NIST

Organochlorides
Persistent organic pollutants under the Stockholm Convention
Persistent organic pollutants under the Convention on Long-Range Transboundary Air Pollution

ru:Гексахлоран